Weller Flugzeugbau is a German aircraft manufacturer, owned by Roman Weller and  based in Biberfeld. The company was founded in 1987 and in 2012 had two employees. It specializes in the design and manufacture of ultralight aircraft, aircraft parts and aircraft repairs. The company has done contract specialized welding for automotive companies, including DaimlerChrysler, Porsche and BMW as well as work for aircraft manufacturers, including Scheibe Flugzeugbau and Sauer aircraft engines, and aviation museums, such as the Musée de l'Air, Deutsches Museum and the Technikmuseum Speyer.

Aircraft

References

External links

Aircraft manufacturers of Germany
1987 establishments in Germany